The Timotean languages were spoken in the Venezuelan Andes around what is now Mérida. It is assumed that they are extinct. However, Timote may survive in the so-far unattested Mutú (Loco) language, as this occupies a mountain village (Mutús) within the old Timote state.

Genetic relations
There is no apparent connection to the Chibchan, Arawakan, or Cariban families, apart from sporadic resemblances with Paez and some divergent Chibchan languages, so Timotean appears to be an independent family.

Jolkesky (2016) also notes that there are lexical similarities with the Jirajaran languages.

Languages
There were two closely related languages, each a pair of dialects:
Timote–Cuica (Miguri, Cuica, "Cicua", spoken by the Timoto–Cuica people)
Mucuchí–Maripú (Mocochí, Mirripú)
Traditionally, Mucuchí and Mirripú have been classified as dialects of Timote, with Cuica as a distinct language, but the data in Loukotka (1968) indicates that Cuica is a dialect of Timote, and that Mucuchí–Mirripú are a separate language (Kaufman 2007; Campbell 1997, 2012).

Vocabulary
Loukotka (1968) lists the following basic vocabulary items for Timotean languages.

{| class="wikitable sortable"
! gloss !! Timote !! Cuica !! Mocochi !! Mirripú
|-
! one
| kári || karí || karí || karí
|-
! two
| gem || xem || xem || xem
|-
! three
| shuént || shuent || shut || sut
|-
! head
| ki-kushám || ki-kushan || kisham || 
|-
! ear
| ki-kumeu || ki-kumeu || ti-subú || 
|-
! tooth
| ki-kunñuch ||  || chi-runch || 
|-
! man
| kiukiai || kiukiai || kaʔak || kage
|-
! water
| shömpú || shombuch || shimpué || shimpú
|-
! fire
| shirup || shnopa || churup || chirup
|-
! sun
| nareúpa || nareupa || umpú || 
|-
! maize
| chxá || chxa || chixsak || chipxak
|-
! bird
| kiukchú || kchu ||  || 
|-
! house
| kurakata || kfok || shimanakot || sharakot
|}

References

External links
 Fabre: Mutús

 
Indigenous languages of the Americas
Extinct languages of South America
Languages of Venezuela
Language families